Balscote or Balscott is a village in the civil parish of Wroxton, Oxfordshire, about  west of Banbury.  The Domesday Book of 1086 records the place-name as Berescote. Curia regis rolls from 1204 and 1208 record it as Belescot. An entry in the Book of Fees for 1242 records it as Balescot. Its origin is Old English, meaning the cottage, house or manor of a man called Bælli.

Church and chapel

Church of England
The earliest features of the Church of England parish church of St Mary Magdalene include a Norman font and an Early English Gothic window. Most of the present church building is 14th-century, built in a Decorated Gothic style. It is a Grade II* listed building.  The parish of St Mary Magdalene is now one of eight in the Ironstone Benefice.

Methodist chapel
Balscote had a Methodist chapel but this has now been converted into a private home.

Secular buildings
Many of Balscote's buildings are of local Hornton Stone. Priory Farm is a 14th-century hall, extended in the 15th century and modernised in the 17th and 18th centuries. Grange Farm is a 15th- or early 16th-century house, extended and modernised in the 17th and 18th centuries. Both houses may have been built by the owners of nearby Wroxton Abbey.  

Balscote has a public house, The Butchers Arms, which is controlled by the Hook Norton Brewery.  In 1996 Balscote Village Hall Trust, a registered charity, started planning and fund-raising to build a community hall. Building began in October 2010 and was completed in 2011. It is a timber building.

Notable residents
 Nicholas de Balscote (died 1320), Chief Baron of the Irish Exchequer,  was born in Balscote.
 Alexander Petit (died 1400), one of the dominant figures in late 14th-century Ireland, was also a native of Balscote. He held many important offices including Bishop of Ossory, Bishop of Meath and Lord Chancellor of Ireland. As was usual at the time he was more commonly referred to, not by his family name, but his birthplace, as Alexander de Balscot. He may have been a relative of Nicholas de Balscote, who is known to have appointed several family members to important positions in Ireland, or they may simply have shared a birthplace.

References

Bibliography

External links

 

Villages in Oxfordshire